The Rexist Party, or simply Rex, was a far-right Catholic, nationalist, authoritarian and corporatist political party active in Belgium from 1935 until 1945. The party was founded by a journalist, Léon Degrelle, and, unlike other fascist parties in the Belgium of the time, advocated Belgian unitarism and royalism. Initially the party ran in both Flanders and Wallonia, but it never achieved much success outside Wallonia and Brussels. Its name was derived from the Roman Catholic journal and publishing company Christus Rex (Latin for Christ the King).

The highest electoral achievement of the Rexist Party was its gaining of 21 out of 202 deputies (with 11.4% of the vote) and twelve senators in the 1936 election. Never a mass movement, it was on the decline by 1938. During the German occupation of Belgium in World War II, Rex was the largest collaborationist group in French-speaking Belgium, paralleled by the Vlaamsch Nationaal Verbond (VNV) in Flanders. By the end of the war Rex was widely discredited, and was banned following the liberation.

Initially modelled on Italian Fascism and Spanish Falangism, it later drew closer to German Nazism. The Party espoused a "right-wing revolution" and the dominance of the Catholic Church in Belgium, but its ideology came to be vigorously opposed by the leader of the Belgian Church Cardinal van Roey, who called Rexism a "danger to the church and to the country".

Ideology
The ideology of Rex, which was loosely based on the writings of Jean Denis, called for the "moral renewal" of Belgian society through dominance of the Catholic Church, by forming a corporatist society and abolishing liberal democracy. Denis became an enthusiastic member of Rex, and later wrote for the party newspaper Le Pays Réel. The original programme of Rexism borrowed strongly from Charles Maurras' integralism. It rejected liberalism, which it deemed decadent, and was strongly opposed to both Marxism and capitalism, instead striving for a corporatist economic model, idealising rural life and traditional family values.

In its early period — until around 1937 — Rexism cannot accurately be categorised as a fascist movement. Rather it was a populist, authoritarian and conservative Catholic nationalist movement that initially tried to win power by democratic means, and did not want totally to abolish democratic institutions. The party increasingly made use of fascist-style rhetoric, but only after Degrelle's own defeat in a by-election in April 1937 did it openly embrace anti-Semitism and anti-parliamentarism, following the model of German Nazism. Historian and expert on fascism Roger Griffin only considers the Rexist Party during the German occupation of Belgium as "fully fascist"; until then he considers it "proto-fascist".

The Rexist movement attracted support almost exclusively from Wallonia. On 6 October 1936, party leader Léon Degrelle made a secret agreement with Rex's Flemish counterpart, the Vlaams Nationaal Verbond (VNV; "Flemish National Union") led by Staf De Clercq. Both movements strove for a corporatist system, but unlike the Rexists, the VNV sought to separate Flanders from Belgium and to unite it with the Netherlands. The Flemish side cancelled the agreement after just one year. It also faced competition from the ideologically similar (but explicitly anti-German) Légion Nationale ("National Legion") of Paul Hoornaert.

Pre-war politics
The Rexist Party was founded in 1935 after its leader Léon Degrelle had left the mainstream Catholic Party which he deemed too moderate. It targeted disappointed constituencies such as traditionalist Catholics, veterans, small traders and jobless people. In the Depression era, it initially won considerable popularity — mostly due to its leader's charisma and energy. Its greatest success was when it won 11.5 per cent of the total vote in the 1936 election. On that occasion the Rexist Party took 21 of the 202 seats in the Chamber of Deputies and 8 out of 101 in the Senate, making it the fourth-strongest force in Parliament, behind the major established parties (Labour, Catholic, Liberal).

However, the support for the party (even at its height) was extremely localized: Rexists succeeded in garnering over 30 per cent of the vote in the French-speaking province of Luxembourg, compared with just 9 per cent in equally French-speaking Hainaut. Degrelle admired Adolf Hitler's rise to power and progressively imitated the tone and style of fascist campaigning, while the movement's ties to the Roman Catholic Church were increasingly repudiated by the Belgian clergy.

Degrelle ran in the April 1937 Brussels by-election against Prime Minister Paul van Zeeland of the Catholic Party, who was supported — in the hope of thwarting a Rexist victory — by all other parties, including even the Communists. The Archbishop of Mechelen and primate of the Catholic Church of Belgium, Jozef-Ernest Cardinal van Roey, intervened, rebuking Rexist voters, insisting that even abstention from voting would be sinful, and calling Rexism "a danger to the country and to the Church". Degrelle was decisively defeated: he obtained only 20 per cent of the vote, the rest going to Van Zeeland.

Afterwards, Rexism allied itself with the interests of Nazi Germany even more strongly and incorporated Nazi-style antisemitism into its platform. At the same time, its popularity declined sharply. In the 1939 national election, Rex's share of votes fell to 4.4 per cent, and the party lost 17 of its 21 seats, largely to the mainstream Catholic and Liberal parties.

Second World War

With the German invasion of Belgium in 1940, Rexism welcomed German occupation, even though it had initially supported the pre-war Belgian policy of neutrality.  While some former Rexists went into the underground resistance or (like José Streel) withdrew from politics after they had come to see the Nazis' anticlerical and extreme anti-Semitic policies enforced in occupied Belgium, most Rexists, however, proudly supported the occupiers and assisted German forces with the repression of the territory wherever they could. Nevertheless, the popularity of Rex continued to drop. In 1941, at a reunion in Liège, Degrelle was booed by about a hundred demonstrators.

In August 1944, Rexist militia were responsible for the Courcelles Massacre.

Collaboration
Closely affiliated with Rex was the Walloon Legion, a unit within the German Army (Wehrmacht) and later the Waffen-SS raised from French-speaking volunteers in Belgium with Rexist support after German invasion of the Soviet Union. After an initial failure to attract recruits, Degrelle volunteered for the unit as a publicity stunt and spent much of the rest of the war outside Belgium on the Eastern Front. He increasingly saw the Walloon Legion as a better vehicle for seeking German support than the Rexist Party, and recruitment drained the party of its cadres. Whilst Degrelle was absent, nominal leadership of the party passed to Victor Matthys.

End of Rexism
From the liberation of Belgium in September 1944, the party had been banned. With the fall of Nazi Germany in 1945, many former Rexists were imprisoned or executed for their role during collaboration. Victor Matthys and José Streel were both executed by firing squad, Jean Denis (who had played only a minor role during the war) was imprisoned.

Degrelle took refuge in Francoist Spain. He was convicted of treason in absentia in Belgium and sentenced to death, but repeated requests to extradite him were turned down by the Spanish government. Stripped of his citizenship and excommunicated (later lifted in Germany), Degrelle died in Málaga in 1994.

Election results

Formations de Combat 
The Rexists had their own paramilitary wing known as the Formations de Combat, founded in 1940 and having around 4000 members. Their members wore dark blue uniforms with the red Burgundian cross. Due to the constant depletion of its strength through members volunteering for more active forms of service in the German forces, the Formations had, by the end of 1943, virtually ceased to function.

See also

Paul Colin
Pierre Daye

References

Bibliography

 Conway, Martin. Collaboration in Belgium: Leon Degrelle and the Rexist Movement 1940–1944. 
 
 
 Littlejohn, David. The Patriotic Traitors: A History of Collaboration in German-occupied Europe, 1940–45. 
 Streel, José. La révolution du XXème siècle (réédition du livre paru en 1942 à la NSE à Bruxelles), préface de Lionel Baland, Déterna, Paris, 2010.

Further reading

Banned far-right parties
Antisemitism in Belgium
Fascist parties in Belgium
Catholic political parties
Political parties established in 1930
Political parties disestablished in 1945
1930 establishments in Belgium
1945 disestablishments in Belgium
Belgian collaboration during World War II
Defunct political parties in Belgium
Catholicism and far-right politics
Fascist parties
Monarchist parties
Theocrats